The 2019–20 season was Società Sportiva Calcio Napoli's 74th season in Serie A. Following a 2nd-place finish the previous season, the club competed in three competitions: Serie A, the Coppa Italia, and the UEFA Champions League, starting in the round of 16 and the group stage in the latter two competitions, respectively.

The season was coach Carlo Ancelotti's second in charge, following his appointment in May 2018 to replace Maurizio Sarri, but he was sacked on 10 December after a poor run of results, and replaced by Gennaro Gattuso the following day.

Players

Squad information
Last updated on 9 February 2020
Appearances include league matches only

Transfers

In

Loans in

Out

Loans out

Pre-season and friendlies

Competitions

Serie A

League table

Results summary

Results by round

Matches

Coppa Italia

UEFA Champions League

Group stage

Knockout phase

Round of 16

Statistics

Appearances and goals

|-
! colspan=14 style="background:#5DAFE3; color:#FFFFFF; text-align:center"| Goalkeepers

|-
! colspan=14 style="background:#5DAFE3; color:#FFFFFF; text-align:center"| Defenders

|-
! colspan=14 style="background:#5DAFE3; color:#FFFFFF; text-align:center"| Midfielders

|-
! colspan=14 style="background:#5DAFE3; color:#FFFFFF; text-align:center"| Forwards

|-
! colspan=14 style="background:#5DAFE3; color:#FFFFFF; text-align:center"| Players transferred out during the season

Goalscorers

Clean sheets

Last updated: 23 June 2020

Disciplinary record

Last updated: 12 February 2020

References

S.S.C. Napoli seasons
Napoli
Napoli